Elmont is an unincorporated hamlet and census-designated place (CDP) located in northwestern Hempstead in Nassau County, New York, United States, along its border with the borough of Queens in New York City. The population was 35,265 at the 2020 census.

The hamlet is famous for Belmont Park which hosts the Belmont Stakes, the third leg of the prestigious Triple Crown of thoroughbred racing. Elmont is also home to UBS Arena, home of the NHL's New York Islanders.

Elmont has tried incorporating itself as a village multiple times over the years, but has been unable to successfully do so.

History
In 1650, Christopher and Thomas Foster purchased a large plot of land. The Fosters' land was controlled by Dutch settlers. The Fosters intended to raise cattle and sheep on their newly settled land, the Hempstead Plains of Long Island. They named this place "Foster's Meadow"—a name which would remain for the next 200 years of the village's history.

By the mid-17th century, descendants of Sephardic Jews were settling on the Hempstead Plains for agriculture. Control of the Dutch colony of New Amsterdam shifted to England in 1664. This marked the first gradual cultural shift in Foster's Meadow with the establishment of a community of predominantly English Protestant farmers, and their families. In 1683, Long Island was divided into three counties, Kings, Queens, and Suffolk County. Under this new structure, Foster's Meadow was originally part of Queens County. During 1790 George Washington passed through the town while touring to the east on Long Island. The current boundaries of Elmont were decided upon in 1898; at this point, Nassau County was created, leading to conflict over land, and monies owed as a result of Elmont's boundary shift from Queens.

It was during the mid-19th century that Foster's Meadow experienced its second cultural shift. There was an influx of Roman Catholic and Ashkenazi Jewish farmers from Brooklyn and Middle Village to the west. These ethnic groups were largely of German and Italian descent, practicing both Roman Catholicism and Judaism.

Indeed, the Catholic population in Foster's Meadow grew to an extent. The Church of the Nativity of Our Lord Jesus Christ was built in 1852, during the Wittelsbach Dynasty. The Roman Catholic Church was re-dedicated as Saint Boniface Roman Catholic Parish, in honor of the Patron Saint of Germany, in 1857. The Parish provided a focal point for the gradual development of a Catholic population base. Rev. Peter Hartraub was the founding pastor, and was appointed the first resident pastor of Foster's Meadow in 1858. Rev. Peter Hartraub built a new rectory and, in 1887, a new school with four classrooms on the first floor and an auditorium on the second. The Dominican Sisters were invited to teach in the Catholic School, and they built a convent on parish land donated to them.

The community underwent its next political reshuffling in 1882, being subdivided into districts with unique names and boundaries (including Alden Manor and Locustwood); it was at this time that Foster's Meadow was renamed Elmont. In 1902, a syndicate headed by August Belmont Jr. and former Secretary of the Navy William C. Whitney sought land on Long Island to build the most elaborate racetrack in America, one modeled after the great race courses of Europe. They found what they were looking for on the border of Queens County and Nassau County. Belmont Racetrack, was arguably the most significant milestone in the development of modern-day Elmont. Originally known as Foster's Meadow, the 650 acres of land included Oaklands, a turreted Tudor-Gothic mansion owned by William de Forest Manice, which was to serve as the track's Turf and Field Club until 1956.

With the opening of Belmont Park in 1905, Elmont reached a turning point in its history. The farms were sold, and subdivided for houses. Most of the new homes were owned by people, who worked at Belmont Racetrack. Many businesses were formed on Hempstead Turnpike, to support the blooming suburban location. By 1915, the Racetrack was opened to the public, attracting both visitors and migrant workers to the area. Housing developments, and businesses grew in the area surrounding the racetrack to meet the needs of these workers; this process of development to meet the workers' needs continued in successive waves, ultimately representing a shift in Elmont from rural farmland to suburbia.

In 1910, Belmont Racetrack hosted the first air race ever in the United States of America. Wilbur and Orville Wright staged an international aerial competition at Belmont Park that drew 150 000 spectators. The race ran from Belmont Park to the Statue of Liberty, and back to Belmont Park.

In 1918, the United States Postal Service delivered their first inter-city Air Mail Service between New York City and Washington, D.C. Belmont Park was designated as the delivery terminal for New York.

Belmont Park was the site of "War Relief Day" in 1940 to benefit the American Red Cross and in 1943 hosted "Back the Attack" Day, wherein fans had to buy a war bond to gain admission to the track. Total receipts that day were between $25 million and $30 million. 

After the Second World War, Elmont hosted widespread development of attractive suburban tract homes. Many of these homes were constructed with a brick-veneer ground story in variations of the Cape Cod style, particularly around Dutch Broadway. On Hempstead Turnpike, older smaller shingled homes cluster near Belmont Park.

In 2017, New York State's Development Corporation (Empire State Development) issued a Request for Proposals for a part of the Belmont Park Property to redevelop land on the property that would enhance the Park and surrounding communities. The two bidders for the site were New York City FC and the New York Islanders. On December 19, 2017, various news reports surfaced, indicating that the state of New York had selected the Islanders' bid. On December 20, 2017 a news conference was held confirming those reports and a deal had been secured. Speakers included NHL Commissioner Gary Bettman. The end result was construction of UBS Arena to become the new home arena for the Islanders. The arena opened in fall 2021.

Failed incorporation attempts 
Elmont has made many attempts over the years to incorporate itself as a village. It first attempted incorporating in 1931 but was unable to do so. The same thing happened again in 1940 and again in 1949. By then, the Nassau County charter had changed (it was amended in 1938) so as to mandate that any new village incorporated after 1938 adhere to Nassau County's zoning laws.

Education 
Elmont is served mainly by the nationally recognized Blue Ribbon School of Excellence, Elmont Memorial High School which is part of the Sewanhaka Central High School District.

Only a small section of Elmont is zoned to Sewanhaka High School. Most students who attend live in the villages of Floral Park and Stewart Manor.

Elmont Memorial High School, former lacrosse powerhouse, recently was recognized as having the largest percentage of African-American high school students receive a "3" or higher on Advanced Placement tests nationally. In 2004, it had a graduation rate of 100 percent which was a first for the Sewanhaka Central High School District.

Elmont Memorial is also known for having its award-winning Model United Nations club. Elmont's Model UN team is known for beating thousands of high schools in the conferences that they attend.

Sewanhaka High School is nationally ranked by U.S. News & World Report as one of the best high schools in the state of New York and the nation. Some students can also attend the other high schools in the district for special programs.

The Elmont Union Free School District provides primary school education for Elmont residents. In 2005, the Elmont Union Free School District was recognized by the New York State Comptroller as one of 5 out of 52 districts cited as "well managed."

Closest schools

Closest elementary schools
 Dutch Broadway School (Grades K-6, Students: 997)
 Clara H. Carlson School (Grades K-6, Students: 885)
 Gotham Avenue School (Grades K-6, Students: 589)
 Covert Avenue School (Grades K-6, Students: 700)
 Alden Terrace School (Grades K-6, Students: 550)
 Stewart Manor School (Grades K-6, Students: 344)

Closest high schools
 Elmont Memorial High School (Grades 7–12, Students: 2,346)
 H. Frank Carey High School (Grades 7–12, Students: 1,831)
 New Hyde Park Memorial High School (Grades 7–12, Students: 1,655)
 Sewanhaka High School (Grades 7–12, Students: 1,567)
 Floral Park Memorial High School (Grades 7–12, Students: 1,510)

Closest colleges and universities
 Molloy College (Rockville Centre, NY)

Transportation
Elmont is located on the border of Nassau County and the New York City borough of Queens.

Closest airports include:
 John F. Kennedy International Airport (7 miles, Queens, NY)
 LaGuardia Airport (13 miles, Queens, NY)
 Sands Point Seaplane Base (public use, Port Washington, Long Island, NY)

The Long Island Rail Road (LIRR) provides race-day-only passenger service to Belmont Park from Jamaica and Penn Station. Elmont is near the Floral Park, New Hyde Park and Valley Stream stations of the LIRR's Main Line, which provide regular commuter service to NYC. The Elmont station opened for eastbound trains in November 2021 and for westbound trains in October 2022.

The Nassau Inter-County Express bus system serves Elmont with routes n1 (Elmont Road/Central Ave.), and n6 on Hempstead Turnpike (near Belmont Park Racetrack) for connections to the LIRR, the New York City Subway, and MTA Regional Bus Operations.

Elmont is located at the junction of the Cross Island Parkway and Southern State Parkway, providing quick access to the Long Island parkway system.

Geography

Elmont is on the Queens (NYC)/Nassau County border, earning it the name "The Gateway to Long Island."

Demographics

2020 census

Note: the US Census treats Hispanic/Latino as an ethnic category. This table excludes Latinos from the racial categories and assigns them to a separate category. Hispanics/Latinos can be of any race.

2010 census
Elmont is the second most diverse suburb in New York State. At the 2010 census the population was 33,198. The makeup of the population was 28.5% White, 45.5% African American, 0.5% Native American, 10.9% Asian, 0.0% Pacific Islander, 10.4% from other races, and 4.2% from two or more races. Hispanic or Latino of any race were 21.8% of the population.

2000 census

At the 2000 census, there were 32,657 people, 12,902 households and 10,842 families residing in the CDP. The population density was 9,589.9 per square mile (3,697.6/km2). There were 10,151 housing units at an average density of 2,980.9/sq mi (1,149.4/km2). The racial makeup of the CDP was 45.6% White, 34.7% African American, 0.1% Native American, 9.1% Asian, 0.1% Pacific Islander, 3.69% from other races, and 1.45% from two or more races. Hispanic or Latino of any race were 14.3% of the population.

There were 10,902 households, of which 39.2% had children under the age of 18 living with them, 56.9% were married couples living together, 17.2% had a female householder with no husband present, and 20.8% were non-families. 17.4% of all households were made up of individuals, and 8.5% had someone living alone who was 65 years of age or older. The average household size was 3.29 and the average family size was 3.68.

26.4% of the population were under the age of 18, 8.7% from 18 to 24, 30.5% from 25 to 44, 21.8% from 45 to 64, and 12.5% who were 65 years of age or older. The median age was 36 years. For every 100 females, there were 90.3 males. For every 100 females age 18 and over, there were 84.9 males.

Rise in Household Income 
The community has continued to see a rise in median income since the issuance of the 2010 census indicating a surge of affluence. In 2010, the median household income was $80,356. According to the 2020 American Community Survey 5-Year Estimates, the median household income is $100,923.

Climate
Elmont has a humid subtropical climate (Cfa) and average monthly temperatures range from 32.3 °F in January to 75.3 °F in July.  The hardiness zone is 7b.

Houses of worship
 St. Boniface (Roman Catholic)
 Cathedral of St. Vincent De Paul (Syro-Malankara and Roman Catholic)
 Elmont Jewish Center (Orthodox)
 Muhammadi Masjid (Muslim)
 Noori Islamic Center of Elmont (Muslim)
 Temple B'nai Israel of Elmont (Reform)
 Shiva Vishnu Vedic Temple (Hindu)
 Dharma Green Island Buddhist Monastery (Buddhist)
 ISKCON Hare Krishna Temple (Hindu)
 St. Paul's German Presbyterian Church and Cemetery
 Elmont Temple SDA church (Seventh Day Adventist)
 The Sanctuary of Elmont (Pentecostal)
 Bible Baptist Church (Baptist)

Notable people
 Cara Castronuova (born 1980), Italian Chinese Filipino American actress, reality TV star, sports announcer, and two-time Golden Gloves boxing champion once ranked #2 nationally by USA Boxing. Certified as a boxing coach by the New York State Athletic Commission, she is also a personal trainer certified by ISSA (International Sports Sciences Association). Popularly known as one of the celebrity trainers on Season 11 of NBC's The Biggest Loser (American TV series), Cara is also the founder of the charity Knockout Obesity Foundation.
 Jordan Dangerfield (born 1990), NFL football player
 Nelson DeMille, author.
 DJ Skribble (born 1968), Italian American DJ, music producer, remixer, radio personality, and actor.
 Mike Gallo (born 1975), Italian American bass guitarist, Punk Rock & Paintbrushes charity artist, and music producer with American rock & roll NYHC bands Agnostic Front, Murphy's Law, Stigma, and On The Rise.
 Steve Gallo (born 1981), Italian American drummer, guitarist, and music producer with American rock & roll NYHC bands Agnostic Front, Inhuman, On The Rise
 Delila Hernandez (born 1984), French Puerto Rican American singer-songwriter, bass & acoustic guitars, piano player, and music producer with American rock & roll band The Last Internationale.
 Andy Kaufman (born 1949), Jewish American sketch comedy Saturday Night Live actor was laid to rest in Beth David Cemetery. 
 Bob LeRose, advertising artist and comic book colorist for DC Comics.
 Donna Orender (née Geils) (born 1957), Women's Pro Basketball League All-Star and WNBA commissioner.
 Ryan Penagos (born 1981), Vice President & Creative Executive for Marvel Entertainment, actor, and producer of Marvel New Media digital content. He is often the face of Marvel digital communications to fans, including hosting livestreams, podcasts, and video series. In November 2021 Ryan was picked to host the livestream premiere of Marvel Games’ Marvel Future Revolution.
 Dennis Peron (born 1945) Italian American Vietnam War veteran, 1964 Sewanhaka alumni, co-authored Proposition 215, The Compassionate Use Act of 1996. Prop. 215 passed with 5,382,915 (55.6%) majority votes in favor, and was enacted on November 5, 1996.
 Marco Rivera (born 1972), National Football League offensive lineman.
 Bob Rozakis, comic book writer for DC Comics, editor, and creator of Bumblebee, the Calculator and Mister E, co-creator of 'Mazing Man and Hero Hotline.
 Vinny Testaverde (born 1963), NFL quarterback and Heisman Award winner.
 Josh Tilotta (born 1979), Italian American guitarist, backing vocals, and music producer with American rock & roll NYHC bands Stigma, Last Call Brawl, and Pledge Of Resistance.
Maju Varghese, attorney and director of the White House Military Office

References

Sources
History of Belmont Park 1905–1968
Early Long Island: a colonial study by Martha Bockée Flint
Native American Indian Archaeology of Long Island
Long Island Indians and The Early Settlers
United States Jewish History
The Thirteen Colonies Jewish History

External links
 Elmont Herald – Local News and Information – published in Elmont, NY
 Belmont Park
 Town of Hempstead, Long Island, NY
 Locustwood / Gotham Civic Association website
 Three Village Times

Hempstead, New York
Hamlets in New York (state)
Census-designated places in New York (state)
Census-designated places in Nassau County, New York
Hamlets in Nassau County, New York
1650 establishments in the Dutch Empire